Advent Online Knowledge, Inc. was a Schaumburg, Illinois-based producer of software for Prime Computer minicomputers.

Products
 AOKCALC - spreadsheet program
 Extra-Sensory Perception (ESP) - enabled a system administrator to monitor the activities of a selected terminal user or scan the activities of all terminal users on a system
 Extra-Sensory Perception.2 (ESP.2) - enabled a system administrator to capture all prelogon activities of selected dial-up and direct-connect lines in a file
 Financial Reporting System (FRS) 
 Personal Calculator - a visual calculator

References

Defunct companies based in Illinois
Defunct software companies of the United States
Schaumburg, Illinois